Henry Newton (c. 1531 – 2 May 1599), of East Harptree, Somerset, Barrs Court and Hanham, Gloucestershire, was an English politician.

He was a Member (MP) of the Parliament of England for Wells in 1571.

References

1531 births
1599 deaths
English MPs 1571
People from Wells, Somerset